Leslie Herstik (born 25 August 1963) is an Australian speed skier. He competed at the 1992 Winter Olympics in the demonstration sport of Speed skiing with a run of

References 

1963 births
Living people
Speed skiers
Speed skiers at the 1992 Winter Olympics